The Fraternal Hall Building is a historic building in Palo Alto, California. It was built in 1898 for the Fraternal Hall Association. The founding members included Knights of Pythias and Freemasons. The association sold the building in 1925, and the second floor was home to the Elks Club.

The building was designed in the Renaissance architectural style. It has been listed on the National Register of Historic Places since February 15, 1990.

References

Buildings and structures completed in 1898
Clubhouses on the National Register of Historic Places in California
National Register of Historic Places in Santa Clara County, California
Renaissance Revival architecture in California